Miss Bellows Falls Diner is a historic diner at 90 Rockingham Street in Bellows Falls, Vermont.  The diner was constructed in 1941 by the Worcester Lunch Car Company as #771, and was listed on the National Register of Historic Places in 1983.

Description and history
The Miss Bellows Falls Diner stands on the southwest side of Rockingham Street, just northwest of the central business district of Bellows Falls.  The diner is set parallel and close to the road.  It is a barrel-roofed metal structure,  in size, its exterior finished in original enamel panels bearing the diner's name.  The entrances to the diner are at its ends, each sheltered by an added vestibule.  The kitchen and bathroom facilities are located in a wood-frame addition to the rear.  The interior of the diner retains original finishes, including walls finished in enamel panels and varnished wood, a polychrome tile floor, oak booths with Formica table tops, and the main counter's marble and metal finish.  The service area also has original features, including enameled refrigerator cabinets and recessed menu boards.

The diner, built in 1941 by the Worcester Lunch Car Company, is the only known intact example of a Worcester barrel-roofed diner in the state. It was originally built for John Korsak and Frank Willie for a location in Lowell, Massachusetts, where it was called Frankie & Johnny's. Both Korsak and Willie were called up into the military for World War II, and the diner was sold to go to Bellows Falls, where it arrived on May 14, 1944, replacing an earlier diner on the site.

Date of Construction
The National Register application for Miss Bellows Falls Diner incorrectly states this diner was assembled "probably in the 1930s", but its model number (#771) indicates 1941. The Rosebud (diner) in Somerville, Massachusetts, Worcester #773, was built in 1941. Worcester serialized their diners consecutively in order of production.

See also
National Register of Historic Places listings in Windham County, Vermont

References

External links

Diners on the National Register of Historic Places
Diners in the United States
Commercial buildings on the National Register of Historic Places in Vermont
Restaurants in Vermont
Buildings and structures in Bellows Falls, Vermont
National Register of Historic Places in Windham County, Vermont